Captain America II: Death Too Soon is a 1979 American made-for-television superhero film based on the Marvel Comics character Captain America, directed by Ivan Nagy and starring Reb Brown. The film was preceded by Captain America earlier the same year. It was aired on CBS in two one-hour slots. The first part aired on November 23, 1979, and the second aired the next night, leading into the conclusion of Salem's Lot.

Plot
Steve Rogers (Reb Brown) is first shown sketching a portrait of a Mrs. Shaw (Susan French), who complains to him about a gang of muggers who have been stealing the proceeds from cashed Social Security checks; she denies having cashed hers. He bids her to do this in order to set a trap for the muggers and springs the trap as Captain America.

In the meantime, a free-lance revolutionary terrorist calling himself General Miguel (Christopher Lee), planning to fight an unspecified war, kidnaps a Professor Ian Ilson (Christopher Cary) and forces him to resume his research in manipulative gerontology. Ilson has managed to formulate both a chemical that accelerates aging and the antidote to the same chemical, and Miguel, posing as the warden of a prison in Oregon near Portland, plans to use the chemicals in question to hold Portland hostage for a multimillion-dollar ransom.

Ultimately Rogers and Miguel directly clash face-to-face, and when Miguel throws a glass bottle of the aging accelerant into the air, hoping it will shatter against Captain America's body, the Captain throws his shield into the air, where it shatters the bottle in such a manner that the aging accelerant splashes them both. However, the Captain only receives a minor amount and thus only ages a month. Miguel, on the other hand, ages to death in less than a minute.

Cast
 Reb Brown as Steve Rogers / Captain America
 Christopher Lee as General Miguel
 Connie Sellecca as Dr. Wendy Day
 Len Birman as Dr. Simon Mills
 Katherine Justice as Helen Moore
 Christopher Cary as Professor Ian Ilson
 William Lucking as Stader
 Stanley Kamel as Kramer
 Ken Swofford as Everett Bliss
 Lana Wood as Yolanda
 Susan French as Mrs. Shaw

Release
The film was released theatrically in France in 1980 and had a special film festival screening in Finland in 2014.

References

External links
 
 

Action television films
CBS network films
Films directed by Ivan Nagy
Captain America films
1979 television films
1979 films
1970s superhero films
1979 action films
1970s American films
Live-action films based on Marvel Comics